Mancao is a 1993 Philippine biographical action film directed by Felix E. Dalay. The film stars Phillip Salvador in the title role. The film is based on the life of former policeman Cezar Mancao and his encounter with Red Scorpion Gang leader Joey de Leon.

The film is streaming online on YouTube.

Cast
 Phillip Salvador as Cezar Mancao
 Gabby Concepcion as Joey de Leon
 Snooky Serna as Maricar Mancao
 Edgar Mortiz as Boggart
 Ramon Christopher as Bimbo
 Jon Hernandez as Marcelo
 Amado Cortez as Mancao's Father
 Luz Valdez as Mancao's Mother
 Roberto Pagdanganan as himself
 Vicente Vinarao as himself
 Pantaleon Dumlao as himself
 Everlino Nartates as himself
 Lito Legaspi as Mayor
 Zandro Zamora as Lt. Vargas
 Romy Diaz as Ka George
 Roldan Aquino as Atty. Andaya
 Edwin Reyes as Bert
 Honey Policarpio as Ninfa

Production
The film was planned to be about Red Scorpion Gang leader Joey de Leon with Phillip Salvador portraying his role. However, it was scrapped due to public demand and replaced with a biographical film about Cezar Mancao, portrayed by Salvador, and his encounter with de Leon.

References

External links

Full Movie on Regal Entertainment

1993 films
Filipino-language films
Philippine biographical films
Philippine action films
Moviestars Production films
Regal Entertainment films
Films directed by Felix Dalay